Valley Gardens carries on in a similar vein to their debut album, Wally, including a side-long track, "The Reason Why". Dispensing with the production skills of Rick Wakeman this time around the album is produced by Bob Harris and Wally.

Track listing

Personnel 
Wally
 Roy Webber – lead vocals, acoustic guitar
 Nick Glennie-Smith – keyboards, vocals
 Pete Sage – electric violin, bass guitar, mandolin
 Pete Cosker – lead electric and acoustic guitars, vocals, bass guitar
 Paul Middleton – lap steel guitar, bass guitar
 Roger Narraway – drums, percussion

Guests
 Ray Wherstein – saxophone
 Jan Glennie Smith – vocals (tracks 3 to 4.3)
 Madeline Bell – vocals

Production credits 
 Produced by Bob Harris, Wally
 Engineered by Paul Tregurtha
 Recorded at Morgan Studios, London

External links 
 Wally - Valley Gardens (1975) album credits & releases at AllMusic
 Wally - Valley Gardens (1975) album releases & credits at Discogs.com

1975 albums
Wally (band) albums
Atlantic Records albums
Albums recorded at Morgan Sound Studios